St Andrews Catholic School is a Christian secondary school and sixth form college in Grange Road, Ottways Lane, Leatherhead, close to the town of Epsom, Surrey, England. Originally a convent back in the 19th century, St Andrews School was transformed into a school in 1901; it consists of three main buildings: the central building dating back to the 1900s, a sixth form and performance arts building, finished in 2008, and the Earl building which accommodates History, Geography and Languages, finished in 2017. Named in memory of John Earl who served as Chair of Governors.

The school is on the boundary of Leatherhead and Ashtead and is primarily a faith school, and has links with the local diocese and churches.

The school holds Specialist Maths and Computing College status and is one of the top 10 most popular schools in Surrey.

Due to growing demand, St Andrews School has grown from 600 pupils in 2003 to 934 pupils in 2013 and to 1457 in 2020. The school is forecasted to continue to expand.

Awards 
As of 2022 St Andrews is the Times newspaper's Comprehensive School Of The Year.

This is in addition to St Andrews being named a World Class school. One of only 34 in the country.

Sixth Form
In 2003 the St Andrews Sixth Form was small with only 39 students but has now grown to have a capacity of 300.

History

19th Century 
The school was originally founded as a convent in the 19th century.

20th Century

Second World War 
During the Second World War, in the spring of 1941, St Andrews Convent School was bombed and left badly damaged by a parachute mine. The nuns evacuated, turning the ruined building over to the country. This provided a training premises for the Surrey County Civil Defence and Rescue School (set up in 1940), and run by the founder Eric Claxton, to train for bringing bomb victims out of damaged buildings.

Ofsted 
Ofsted inspections gave the school a Satisfactory grade in 2007 and 2010. This improved to the school receiving an Ofsted result of Outstanding in 2012.

Utilities
The school is gradually to be re-built and a new teaching block is now open, along with a big new sports hall. The new block offers many facilities such as:
Business Studies and Media for sixth formers;
Music;
Drama;
Languages;
A new canteen;
A chapel;
The office;
A sports hall and gym;
Science laboratories

New roofs have been built in 2017 to create more space to shelter students from the rain.

The new Earl Building was built in 2018 which offered nine new classrooms for Languages, History and Geography.

The "Old Gym" was renovated in 2019. It was fitted with new floors, heating, repainted and the windows were changed.

The school renovated 2 science laboratories during the 2019 summer break, and finished the rest in the 2020 summer break. These new science labs bring new technological advancements and ergonomic improvements.

A new sixth from toilet block has also been added to the sixth form area as of the 2021 / 2022 term.

School Links 
This School has close links to Secondary schools such as Salesian School, a split-site Roman Catholic comprehensive secondary school in Chertsey, Surrey.

 Winner of the Barbara Lee Cup for Operatic Aria -  Redhill & Reigate Music Festival, May 2013
 Winner of the Homer Cup (Song Recital) -  Redhill & Reigate Music Festival, May 2013

References 

Academies in Surrey
Secondary schools in Surrey
Leatherhead
1913 establishments in England
Educational institutions established in 1913